Berlin-Hirschgarten station is a station of the Berlin S-Bahn in district of Hirschgarten in the Berlin district of Treptow-Köpenick. It is located north of Hirschgarten on the Berlin-Frankfurt (Oder) railway.
	
The station is served by Berlin S-Bahn line S3 between Erkner and Ostkreuz. Services operate at 10-minute intervals between Ostkreuz and Friedrichshagen.

Notes

External links

Berlin S-Bahn stations
Railway stations in Treptow-Köpenick